Tiris is a band formed by Sahrawi refugees at the Sahrawi refugee camps in Tindouf, Algeria. Their lyrics are about love, loss, and their long struggle and aspirations for independence in their homeland of Western Sahara. Their name honours of a southern zone of their country, known traditionally for being a land of holy men, poets and musicians.

The 9-member group made their first international major performance at the Festival au Désert, in Essakane, Mali in January 2006. The festival's director Manny Ansar defined them as "One of the best performances this year-absolutely wonderful!! I am delighted Tiris were able to participate!". Programmed for the opening night, they had to perform again on the last night by popular demand.

In 2007, Tiris released their first album, entitled "Sandtracks", being the first release of British "Sandblast Arts" label, and touring England with the "Sandblast Tour", with venues in South Bank, Brighton Dome or the Musicport World Music Festival, and they were featured at BBC Radio London.

Tiris performed at the "Ollin Kan Festival" in Mexico in May 2009. The band then made an August tour in Denmark and Sweden, performing at the Malmö Festival, Copenhagen, Asaa and Follenslev.

Musical style 
The band played the traditional Sahrawi music, the Haul, but mixing it with other styles influences, like Desert Blues, Reggae, Flamenco, Jazz, etc... The group played traditional instruments, like the tbal or the tidinit, but also uses electric guitar, bass, keyboard, synthesizer, accordion or even a drum machine.

Band members 
 Ahmed Sidi Mufid AKA Mufeed - vocals
 Mohamed Said Mohamed Salem Esouilma AKA Shueta - vocals
 Ahmed Ahmed Zein AKA Ahmed Zein or Mohamed Salek - tidinit
 Emhamed Ahmed Baba Ahmed AKA Mohamed Zein - electric guitar
 Bauba Bleiel Embarek AKA Beba - keyboards
 Embarka Zeju Ajeen AKA Embarka - dancer, background vocals
 Selma Ali Did AKA Swelma - dancer, background vocals
 Boubba Han Cheikh AKA Boubba - dancer, background vocals
 Mohamed Hafsi AKA Momo - electric bass

Discography 
 Sandtracks (2007)

References

External links 
Old Tiris MySpace page
New Tiris Official MySpace page

Sahrawi musical groups
Musical groups established in 2005
Algerian world music groups